| tries = {{#expr: 
 +  2 +  7 +  4 +  6 +  7 +  3 +  3 +  6
 + 11 +  2 +  6 +  7 +  6 +  2 +  5 +  7
 +  2 +  9 +  3 + 14 + 19 +  1 +  4 + 12
 +  9 +  4 +  8 +  6
 +  7
}}
| top point scorer = 
| top try scorer = 
| venue = Madejski Stadium, Reading
| attendance2 = 4,000
| champions =  Castres Olympique
| count = 1
| runner-up =   Caerphilly
| website = https://web.archive.org/web/20080506141030/http://www.ercrugby.com/eng/
| previous year = 
| previous tournament = 
| next year = 2003–04
| next tournament = 2003–04 European Shield
}}
The 2002–03 European Shield (known as the Parker Pen Shield for sponsorship reasons) was the 1st season of the European Shield, Europe's third-tier club rugby union competition below the Heineken Cup and European Challenge Cup. A total of 16 teams participated, representing five different countries.

This competition was contested between the first round losers from the 2002–03 European Challenge Cup.  The structure of the competition was a purely knockout format; teams played each other on a home and away basis, with the aggregate points winner proceeding to the next round. The final was a single leg.

The competition began on 6 December 2002 and culminated in the final at the Madejski Stadium in Reading on 25 May 2003.  Castres Olympique secured a victory over Caerphilly in the final and picked up their first piece of European Club silverware.

Teams
This competition was contested between the 16 first round losers from the 2002–03 European Challenge Cup.

Matches

Round 1

1st Leg
All kickoff times are local to the match location.

2nd Leg
All kickoff times are local to the match location.

Aggregate Results

Quarter-finals

1st Leg
All kickoff times are local to the match location.

2nd Leg
All kickoff times are local to the match location.

Aggregate Results

Semifinals

1st Leg
All kickoff times are local to the match location.

2nd Leg
All kickoff times are local to the match location.

Aggregate Results

Final

See also
2002-03 Heineken Cup
2002-03 European Challenge Cup
European Shield

External links
 BBC Parker Pen 2002/3 results summary

References

European
2002-03
2002–03 European Challenge Cup
2002–03 in European rugby union
2002–03 in French rugby union
2002–03 in Italian rugby union
2002–03 in Spanish rugby union
2002–03 in Welsh rugby union
2002–03 in Romanian rugby union